Roamer is a Swiss manufacturer of luxury watches, now based in Wallbach, Switzerland.

History

Roamer was founded by Fritz Meyer in Solothurn, Switzerland, in 1888. The company originally concentrated on manufacturing cylinder escapements,. Within only seven years, the company grew to sixty employees and started producing complete watches. In 1895, the company developed its first own calibre and named it "Number 38" to commemorate Meyer's 38th birthday. In 1905, Meyer joined fellow watchmaker Johann Studeli to form the partnership Meyer and Studeli (MST). In the same year, Meyer won a bronze medal at the Liège World Fair. The partnership continued to develop new calibres and enter them into more world fairs, winning silver medals at the Milan Fair in 1906 and Brussels Fair in 1910.

The earliest identified watch is an unmarked lady's pocket watch containing an MST 41 cylinder escapement that has London silver hallmarks for 1908.

In 1917 they purchased fellow Solothurn watchmaker L Tieche Gammeter (LTG). LTG had previously registered the brand "Roamer" in 1908. In 1918 the partnership incorporated Meyer & Studeli SA into the company.

By 1923, production grew to one million units. The jewelled lever-escapement watches were sold under the brand "Roamer". Cylinder, and later pin-lever, watches were sold under the brands Medana and Meda. In 1932 the company started its own dial production line. In 1945, a representative office opened in New York City and in 1952 Meyer and Studeli officially changed its name to Roamer Watch Co. SA. In 1955, Roamer patented the Anfibio watertight watchcase, which proved to be a commercial success. The company launched its first quartz movement in 1972.

In 2003, Roamer returned to manufacturing mechanical watches.

In 2013, its 125th year, Roamer launched a limited new edition of the Stingray Chrono Diver watch.

Roamer is a member of the Federation of the Swiss Watch Industry FH.

Product lines

Anfibio.
Classic
Cralinee
Elements
Galaxy
Jubilé
Limelight
Mechaline
Monza
Mustang
Osiris
Popular
Premier
Rockshell
Rotodate
Saturn
Searock
Soleure
Sonata
Stingray
Superior
Superking
Vanguard
Viscount

References

Other Resources 
 
 
 watchcarefully.com
 artistsguilds.com is registered with Pair Domains
 Vintage Roamer Watch Site

Watch manufacturing companies of Switzerland
Swiss watch brands
Manufacturing companies established in 1888
Privately held companies of Switzerland
Design companies established in 1888
Swiss companies established in 1888